Phad painting or phad (IAST: Phad) is a style religious scroll painting and folk painting, practiced in Rajasthan state of India. The narratives of the folk deities of Rajasthan, mostly of Pabuji and Devnarayan are depicted on the s. The Bhopas, the priest-singers traditionally carry the painted s along with them and use these as the mobile temples of the folk deities, who are worshipped by the Rebari community of the region. Traditionally the s are painted with vegetable colors.

Traditional examples of this art are Devnarayan Ki Phad and Pabuji Ki Phad. This style was revolutionized by Shree Lal Joshi and Pradip Mukherjee about forty years ago. Mukherjee's paintings are based on the stories of Ramcharitmanas, Gita Govinda, Kumārasambhava, Bhagavad Gita and Hanuman Chalisa. The art of  painting was exclusively practiced by the Joshi community. However, in 1960, Shree Lal Joshi opened a school called Joshi Kala Kendra for everyone to learn this art style. Presently, the school is called Chitrashala.

References

Further reading
 (see index: p. 148-152)

External links
 A dedicated website on phad painting

Schools of Indian painting
Rajasthani arts
Rajasthani culture
Indian painting
Bhilwara district
Painted fabrics